New York Squash (formerly the Metropolitan Racquets Association, or MSRA) is a volunteer organization which organizes squash events in the New York metropolitan area.

History
The organization's membership base covers players in the five boroughs of New York City, Long Island, Westchester County, southern New York State, and Fairfield County in Connecticut. New York Squash is one of several regional squash associations which operate under US Squash, the national governing body for the sport. The organization was renamed New York Squash in 2011.

Organization and membership
New York Squash is run by a volunteer board along with some permanent and ad hoc salaried staff. The board meets periodically throughout the year to plan and organize events. Along with similar organizations in Massachusetts, Washington DC and Philadelphia, New York Squash organizes squash tournaments, team leagues and professional matches during the traditional winter squash season (November to April).

New York squash tournaments
The Grand Open – The Grand Open tournament began in 1994 and is an amateur tournament generally held in January with matches at a variety of Manhattan-area squash clubs. The Grand Open is held the same weekend as the Tournament of Champions, a week-long professional squash tournament that features some of the world's top professional players.

The Hyder Trophy Tournament – Founded in 1969 at the New York Athletic Club by Quentin Hyder, the Hyder Trophy is longest continually-running softball squash tournament in North America. It is generally held in May to cap the end of the competitive squash season. Like the Grand Open, it is hosted over three days at a number of Manhattan squash clubs.

Singles squash team leagues
New York Squash organizes leagues with teams from clubs and organizations in Manhattan, Brooklyn, Queens, and the Bronx. While there is currently no universally accepted method for judging amateur individual squash skill level, commonly accepted practices recognizes a range from beginner players (2.0) to professional (6.5). Teams form in October, with matches beginning the first week of November, and continuing through April culminating in a season-ending playoff and championship.

Doubles squash team leagues
New York Squash organizes a Doubles League with teams competing across two skill levels, A and B. The season runs from January–April, and, in prior years, clubs in Manhattan, Brooklyn and Westchester have fielded field teams.

References

External links
 

Sports in New York City
1924 establishments in New York (state)
Squash in New York (state)